The 1972 Cork Junior Hurling Championship was the 75th staging of the Cork Junior Hurling Championship since its establishment by the Cork County Board. The championship ran from 22 October to 3 December 1972.

The final was played on 3 December 1972 at the Athletic Grounds in Cork, between Newcestown and Kildorrery, in what was their first ever meeting in the final. Newcestown won the match by 2-07 to 2-04 to claim their first ever championship.

Newcestown's Frank Kehilly was the championship's top scorer with 5-01.

Results

Quarter-finals

Semi-finals

Final

Championship statistics

Top scorers

Overall

In a single game

References

Cork Junior Hurling Championship
Cork Junior Hurling Championship